The Vasishtha Samhita (Sanskrit: वासिष्ठसंहिता, Vāsiṣṭha Saṁhitā, Vasishtha's Collection) is a 13th century medieval Vaishnavite text, one of the first to describe non-seated hatha yoga asanas including the arm-balancing Kukkutasana, Cockerel Pose. It makes use of the 10th century Vimanarcanakalpa, whose verse it paraphrases in prose to describe what may be the first non-seated asana, the arm-balancing Mayurasana, Peacock Pose. These descriptions in turn were exploited by the 15th century Hatha Yoga Pradipika.

The Vasishtha Samhita shares many verses with the Yoga Yajnavalkya, some of which originate in the earlier Padma Samhita. 

The text, ascribed to the earlier sage Vasishtha, was compiled by an unknown author of the Vaishnavite Shakta sect. Its 45 chapters cover peace, name-chanting, offerings, sacrifices, astrology, and donation.

References

Sources

External links

 Sanskrit text of Vasishtha Samhita
 English prose translation by Manmatha Nath Dutt, Elysium Press, Calcutta, 1907

Hatha yoga texts